Manav Permal, also written as Mannav (born 27 November 1999) is a Fijian footballer who plays either as a midfielder or as a forward for Suva in the Fiji National Football League.

Early career
Permal started playing for his college team Vashist Muni College. After performing well he joined the youth team of Navua. In 2017 he made his debut for their first team. In September 2017 he moved to Suva

International career
Permal had just made his debut for Navua when he was called up by the head coach of the Fiji national football team: Christophe Gamel. He made his debut for Fiji on May 25, 2017 in a 1–1 draw against the Solomon Islands. He came in as a substitute for Setareki Hughes in the 90 minute.

References

External links

Living people
1999 births
Association football forwards
Navua F.C. players
Fiji international footballers
Fijian footballers
Fijian people of Indian descent